Sivapragasam Ratnarajah was a  Sri Lankan Tamil politician  and a Member of Parliament belonging to the Eelam Revolutionary Organisation of Students.He was elected from the Trincomalee Electoral District in 1989. He was graduate from Colombo University.

References

2008 deaths
1952 births
Alumni of the University of Sri Lanka (Colombo)
Eelam Revolutionary Organisation of Students politicians
Members of the 9th Parliament of Sri Lanka
People from Trincomalee
Sri Lankan Hindus
Sri Lankan Tamil politicians